Located south-west of the city of Atar in Mauritania, erg Amatlich is a vast dune barrier of small dimensions (130 km x 5 km to 8 km) trapped between the mountains of the Adrar plateau. The erg, stretching from NW to SE, originates at the cliffs of the Tifoujar Pass and extends to the Akjoujt area where it takes the name of Dkhaïna extending to the Atlantic Ocean.

In addition to endless dunes, Erg Amatlich gathers a great variety of Saharan landscapes such as canyons, cliffs, cultivable basins and palm groves like Azoueïga, located on the west side of the erg.

There are many Neolithic sites, such as the Khatt Lemaiteg.

Climate of erg Amatlich

References 

Ergs of Africa
Deserts of Mauritania
Landforms of Mauritania